Elizabeth City Water Plant is a historic municipal water plant located at Elizabeth City, Pasquotank County, North Carolina. The complex includes the contributing Elizabeth City Water Plant Building, Coagulation Basin (1926), Raw Water Pump House (c. 1935), the Circular Finished Water Reservoir (1926), and the Raw Water Reservoir (c. 1935).  The Elizabeth City Water Plant Building is a Mission Revival style brick building sheathed in stucco and built in 1926.  It consists of a projecting three-bay three-story central pavilion flanked on each side by identical two-story blocks.  It is topped by a broad hipped roof covered by green clay tiles.

It was listed on the National Register of Historic Places in 1994.

References

Industrial buildings and structures on the National Register of Historic Places in North Carolina
Mission Revival architecture in North Carolina
Buildings and structures completed in 1926
Buildings and structures in Pasquotank County, North Carolina
National Register of Historic Places in Pasquotank County, North Carolina